A number of steamships have been named Azov, including -

, a cargo ship wrecked in 1925
, renamed Heinrich Menzell 1901 and wrecked in 1904 near Vladivostok
, sunk in an air raid 2 October 1944
, scrapped in 1973

See also
 
 

Ship names